Useless Bay is a swamp in the U.S. state of Georgia. 

Useless Bay was so named because it is very difficult to navigate.

References

Swamps of Georgia (U.S. state)
Bodies of water of Clinch County, Georgia